Illustrated News or The Illustrated News may refer to:

Canadian Illustrated News, Montreal
The Illustrated Australian News
Illustrated Daily News, Los Angeles
The Illustrated London News
The Illustrated Police News, London
Illustrated Police News (Boston)
Illustrated Sporting and Dramatic News, London
Illustrated Sydney News
The Illustrated War News, London

See also
Disambiguation pages
Illustrated (disambiguation)
Illustrated Magazine
Illustrated Weekly